The 2007–08 Cymru Alliance was the eighteenth season of the Cymru Alliance after its establishment in 1990. The league was won by Prestatyn Town.

League table

External links
Cymru Alliance

Cymru Alliance seasons
2007–08 in Welsh football leagues